Yuval Tal is the founder and president of Payoneer, an Internet-based payment company, and BorderFree, an e-commerce company owned by Pitney Bowes.

Early life and education
Tal was born in 1965 in Israel. He  completed high school in Ramat HaSharon, Israel. He served in the Israeli Defense Forces as a special operations commander.

Professional career
Tal began his career at Radware (NASDAQ:RDWR) in the position of VP business development. Later, he served as general manager of R-U-Sure Ltd. In 1999, Tal co-founded E4X., an early Internet payment solutions company. Under his management, E4X grossed over $500M in the first five years, and in 2007, was rebranded and renamed FiftyOne. The company is noted for enabling  retailers to market and sell products and services around the globe, in their customers’ local currency. The firm rebranded to BorderFree in 2013 and was acquired by Pitney Bowes for $395 million in 2015.

Tal established Payoneer in 2005, providing companies and business with secure  online payout solutions.

References

External links
Biography, personal web site (archive)

1965 births
Living people
Israeli businesspeople
Israeli people of Romanian-Jewish descent
Parsons School of Design alumni
Tel Aviv University alumni